Immanuel, also publicized as Emmanuel, is a 2013 Malayalam comedy-drama film, directed by Lal Jose and produced by S. George. The film stars Mammootty in the title role  with Fahadh Faasil and Reenu Mathews. Lal Jose has stated that it is a "soft film sans hullabaloo" and "essentially tells the story of Immanuel's intrinsic goodness even in the face of adversity."

Synopsis
The film follows the character of Immanuel,who works in a book publishing firm owned by Joseph. When the company is closed down due to unexpected reasons, Immanuel and his family find it difficult to make both ends meet. He then gets a job in a private insurance company which is managed by Jeevan Raj. The movie gives an unvarnished portrayal of the ruthless ways in which private insurance companies work, with scant regard for humanity. Immanuel is cheated by his colleague Venkatesh who grabs his customer and takes the credit. Non performers are forced to leave the organization without prior notice. Clients are repeatedly denied their claims on flimsy grounds while the company makes profit. The film portrays the battle between the ruthless company and Immanuel who tries to set things right for the customers.

Cast

Mammootty as Immanuel
Fahadh Faasil as Jeevan Raj
Reenu Mathews as Annie
 Gouri Shankar as Robin
Salim Kumar as Suku (Peon)
Guinness Pakru as Kannadi Kavi Shivan
Sunil Sukhada as Joseph
Ramesh Pisharody as Venkatesh
P. Balachandran as Gopinathan Nair
Bijukuttan as Driver
Abu Salim as Chandy
Shivaji Guruvayoor as Simon
Balachandran Chullikkadu as Madhavettan
Nedumudi Venu as Jabbar
Anil Murali (cameo) as Velayuthan
Nandhu as Dr. Ramakrishnan
Mukesh (cameo) as Rajasekharan
Devan (cameo) as Kuwait Kumaran
Suja Menon as Saritha
Sukumari as Khadeejumma
Ponnamma Babu s Chandy's wife
Devi Ajith as Sandy Wilson
T Parvathy 
Muktha (cameo) as Jenniffer
Deepika Mohan as Immanuel's co-worker at DTP Center
Anjana Appukuttan as Immanuel's neighbour

Production
Casting for Immanuel began in mid-2012, with both John Abraham and Balachandra Menon rumored to be taking part in the film. Jose denied rumors that Abraham would be acting in the film and Menon also denied that he would perform due to conflicting schedules with his personal life. Actor Mammootty was confirmed as the lead actor, with Fahadh Faasil also confirmed as performing in the film. Faasil was initially said to be performing a "negative role" in Immanuel, which Jose later stated was untrue and that Faasil would be portraying a company executive. In early January 2013, Jose announced that he had cast, a newcomer, Reenu Mathews, as Mammootty's wife in the film.

Filming began in Kochi in January 2013.

Release
The film was released on 5 April 2013.

Critical reception
Smitha of OneIndia gave the movie 4/5 stars and stated, "Immanuel is a touching, heartwarming and poignant tale of human values, endurance and goodness in people" and that the movie "is worth watching this weekend and seems to have all ingredients that might make it a superhit."

Aswin J Kumar of The Times of India gave the movie 3/5 stars, and said that "Immanuel is the latest embodiment among the newly-developed breed of characters who absorb all pain, rage and agony with an enduring smile," but stated that "the problem with Immanuel is that whatever he (Immanuel) does in the film looks more divine than human."

Now running.com rated Immanuel above average. Veeyen said that "'Emmanuel' is a film that talks of the trying times that we live in. It's a delicate film with modest intentions, but which nevertheless remains a miniature gem with a distinct shine. He also praised the performance of mammooty. 'Mammootty is incredibly good as Emmanuel' Veeyen wrote."

Box office
The film was commercial success. The film ran 125 days in theatres.

Soundtrack 
The film's soundtrack contains 4 songs, all composed by Afsal Yusuf. Lyrics by Rafeeq Ahamed, N. M. Shyam.

References

External links
 

2013 films
2010s Malayalam-language films
Films scored by Afzal Yusuf
Indian drama films
Films shot in Kochi
Films directed by Lal Jose
2013 drama films